Bogoroditsk is a town and the administrative center of Bogoroditsky District in Tula Oblast, Russia, located on the Upyorta River, a tributary of the Upa. Population:

History

It was founded in the second half of the 17th century as a wooden fort. In the 1770s, the fort was demolished to make room for the palace of the Bobrinsky family. The main château, designed by Ivan Starov and partly destroyed during World War II, is adjoined by an English park, said to be the earliest in Russia outside St. Petersburg. Bogoroditsk was granted town status in 1777. During World War II, Bogoroditsk was under German occupation from 15 November 1941 until 15 December 1941.

Administrative and municipal status

Within the framework of administrative divisions, Bogoroditsk serves as the administrative center of Bogoroditsky District. As an administrative division, it is incorporated within Bogoroditsky District as Bogoroditsk Town Under District Jurisdiction. As a municipal division, Bogoroditsk Town Under District Jurisdiction is incorporated within Bogoroditsky Municipal District as Bogoroditsk Urban Settlement.

Twin towns and sister cities

Bogoroditsk is twinned with:
 Lučenec, Slovakia
 Rezzato, Lombardy, Italy

Economy 
In 2012, the technology company Varton bought an abandoned factory building and opened the assembly plant. By 2016, total investment in the LED lighting factory reached 1 billion rubles.

References

Sources

Notes
"СССР. Административно-территориальное деление союзных республик. 1987." (USSR. Administrative-Territorial Structure of the Union Republics. 1987) / Составители В. А. Дударев, Н. А. Евсеева. — М.: Изд-во «Известия Советов народных депутатов СССР», 1987. — 673 с.

External links
Official website of Bogoroditsk 
Bogoroditsk Business Directory 
Website of the Bogoroditsk Museum
Mojgorod.ru. Entry on Bogoroditsk 

Cities and towns in Tula Oblast
Bogoroditsky Uyezd
Populated places established in the 17th century